Ziadabad (also Romanized as Zīādābād) is a village in Beyza Rural District, Beyza District, Sepidan County, Fars Province, Iran. At the 2006 census, its population was 226, in 54 families.

References 

Populated places in Beyza County